Choi Jong-Hyuk (born 3 September 1984) is a South Korean football midfielder.

Career statistics

External links 
K-League Player Record 

1984 births
Living people
Association football midfielders
South Korean footballers
Daegu FC players
K League 1 players